Cape Scrymgeour is a high, conspicuous cliffs of red-colored volcanic rock, forming the east end of Andersson Island in Antarctic Sound, off the northeast tip of Antarctic Peninsula. The cape was named by Thomas Robertson, captain of the Active of Dundee, Scotland, in 1893. It was re-identified and charted by the Falkland Islands Dependencies Survey (FIDS) in 1947.

Headlands of the Joinville Island group